The 2006 FIFA World Cup qualification CAF Group 1 was a CAF qualifying group for the 2006 FIFA World Cup. The group comprised Congo, Liberia, Mali, Senegal, Togo and Zambia.

The group was won by Togo, who qualified for the 2006 FIFA World Cup. Togo, Senegal and Zambia qualified for the 2006 Africa Cup of Nations.

Second round

Standings

Results

(due to security concerns related to elections, The match was played behind closed doors)

1